Wayne Township is one of the twenty-seven townships of Ashtabula County, Ohio, United States. The 2010 census found 630 people in the township.

Geography
Located on the southwestern edge of the county, it borders the following townships:
Cherry Valley Township - north
Andover Township - northeast corner
Williamsfield Township - east
Kinsman Township, Trumbull County - southeast corner
Gustavus Township, Trumbull County - south
Greene Township, Trumbull County - southwest corner
Colebrook Township - west
New Lyme Township - northwest corner

No municipalities are located in Wayne Township.

Name and history
It is one of twenty Wayne Townships statewide. Wayne Township was named for Anthony Wayne.

The first white settler in Wayne Township was former Connecticut resident Joshua Forbes, who arrived in 1803.

Government
The township is governed by a three-member board of trustees, who are elected in November of odd-numbered years to a four-year term beginning on the following January 1. Two are elected in the year after the presidential election and one is elected in the year before it. There is also an elected township fiscal officer, who serves a four-year term beginning on April 1 of the year after the election, which is held in November of the year before the presidential election. Vacancies in the fiscal officership or on the board of trustees are filled by the remaining trustees.  The board is currently composed of chairman Robert Magyar and members John Bilek and Dave Sprague.

References

External links
County website

Townships in Ashtabula County, Ohio
Townships in Ohio